Elkhorn Peak is an  summit of the Wallowa Mountains in Wallowa County, Oregon in the United States. It is located in the Eagle Cap Wilderness of the Wallowa National Forest.

See also
List of mountain peaks of Oregon

References

Mountains of Wallowa County, Oregon
North American 2000 m summits